Helsana AG, headquartered in Dübendorf, is a major Swiss health insurance company. The company claims to have 2.2 million customers insured and a revenue of 7.4 billion Swiss Francs, which would make it the largest health and accident insurer in Switzerland. The group employs approximately 3,500 people and has a Switzerland-wide network of 22 general agencies and 20 outlets.

Operations 
The Group comprises three operational subsidiaries which are active in the fields of basic health, supplementary and casualty insurance. These operate under the names Helsana and Progrès as independent brands in the market. From 1 January 2017, Avanex was being merged with Helsana and Sansan with Progrès. Aerosana, another former subsidiary, merged on 1 January 2011 with Progrès. 

The core business of the Helsana Group is basic insurance under the Swiss Health Insurance Act which generates around 70 percent of Helsana's total premium income. The supplementary insurance division provides 27 percent of Helsana's income.

In September, Helsana will be launching the Helsana Plus (Helsana+) bonus programme. The bonus programme allows members to earn Plus points for healthy life choices, social and community engagement, and customer loyalty. Registered customers can receive cashback rewards in return for their points.

History 
Helsana emerged in 1996 from the merger of two health and accident insurance companies, Helvetia and Artisana. Helvetia was founded in 1899, whilst Artisana was founded in 1952. Both were previously supported by a Swiss Verein, who today form the shareholders of Helsana. The Fondation Sana, formerly Stiftung Helvetia Sana and the successor of the Helvetia verein, hold 79 percent of the shares, whilst Artisana's verein holds 21 percent.

References

External links 

 Website Helsana AG

Financial services companies established in 1996
Life insurance companies of Switzerland
Insurance companies of Switzerland
Companies based in the canton of Zürich
Swiss brands